Virident Systems is a computer systems company headquartered in Milpitas, California, that designs and builds computer data storage products. The company was founded in June 2006 and initially received funding from Artiman Ventures, Accel India and Spansion Inc.

In September 2013, Western Digital announced a merger agreement where Virident will be acquired by HGST, in turn a wholly owned subsidiary of Western Digital.

Products
Virident's first NAND flash based product, tachIOn, was announced in June 2010. The tachIOn products are PCIe cards that use field-replaceable modules containing single-level cell (SLC) flash components from, for example, Micron Technology, Samsung Electronics and Toshiba. They support inbuilt RAID and error correction features.

Virident Systems was chosen as a winner of TiE50 award in May 2011 and a winner of the Red Herring Top 100 North America award in June 2011.

References

External links
  Virident Systems official web-site

Companies based in California
Computer storage companies
Computer peripheral companies
2013 mergers and acquisitions
Western Digital